Nawa (other names: Bareh Kheyl, Nāwah, Mahmūd Khel, Barak Khel, Nāwa, Mahmud Khel, Bāreh Kheyl, Bara Khel) is located on  at 2,007 m altitude in the central part of Nawa District, Afghanistan. The town is located within the heartland of the Tarakai tribe of Ghilji Pashtuns.

Climate 
Nawa has a humid continental climate (Köppen: Dsa) with hot summers and cold winters.

Notable people 
Nur Muhammad Taraki (President of Afghanistan from 1978 to 1979);
Enaiatollah Akbari, the protagonist of the book "In the sea there are crocodiles" by Fabio Geda, which tells of the journey of an Afghan child (Enaiat) who escapes from slavery and travels through the Middle East until eventually arriving in Italy, where he lives.

See also
 Ghazni Province

References

Populated places in Ghazni Province